"Rockin" is a song by Canadian singer the Weeknd from his third studio album, Starboy (2016). The song was released to contemporary hit radio in France on May 9, 2017, as the album's fourth international single. The song was written by the Weeknd, Max Martin, Peter Svensson, Savan Kotecha, Ali Payami and Ahmad Balshe, and produced by Payami and Martin, with the Weeknd serving as a co-producer.

Music and composition 
The song is performed in the key of A minor with a tempo of 113 beats per minute.

Chart performance
"Rockin'" peaked at number 44 on the US Billboard Hot 100 despite never being released as a single in North America. The song also charted and peaked at number 25 on the Canadian Hot 100.

Critical reception 
The song was received mixed reviews from music critics. Mosi Reeves from Rolling Stone opined that the song "has an infectious garage-house rhythm courtesy of producers Max Martin and Ali Payami, but all The Weeknd can do is respond with a clunky chorus". Mike Pizzo, writing for the Las Vegas Weekly, described the song as being "2-step-fueled". Furthermore, Christopher Hooton from The Independent wrote that "Rockin'" is a "workout jam". Writing for Spin, Jordan Sargent said the song is "destined to be a single".

Charts

Certifications

Release history

References 

2016 songs
2017 singles
The Weeknd songs
Songs written by Max Martin
Songs written by the Weeknd
Songs written by Peter Svensson
Songs written by Ali Payami
Songs written by Belly (rapper)
Songs written by Savan Kotecha
Song recordings produced by the Weeknd
Song recordings produced by Max Martin
Song recordings produced by Ali Payami
Republic Records singles
XO (record label) singles
Electro songs
UK garage songs